European War may refer to:

 Various armed conflicts in Europe
 Initial North American term for World War I
 European theatre of World War II
 Easytech game series